Jessica Snow (born 1964) is an American abstract artist, curator, and professor. Her paintings and drawings are distinguished by bright, vivid colors through a visual language that employs color, shape and texture to speak in conversation with the traditions of geometric abstraction, biomorphism, and color field painting. Her inspiration is fed by research into mid-century architecture, landscape design, 20th century art history and Asian art history. She lives and works in San Francisco, California, where she teaches painting, drawing and art appreciation at the University of San Francisco. Recently she researched Classical Chinese Gardens in Jiangsu province, and her recent ‘Master of the Nets’ series is based on this research.

Education 

Jessica Snow earned her Bachelor of Arts degree from the University of California, Davis in 1988, where she studied with Wayne Thiebaud, Squeak Carnwath and Cornelia Schultz. After attending a summer residency at the Skowhegan School of Painting and Sculpture in Skowhegan, Maine, she went on to earn her Master of Fine Arts degree from Mills College in Oakland, California in 1996, where she studied with Hung Liu, Ron Nagle, and Moira Roth.

Work 

Snow utilizes techniques, mediums, and approaches from multiple different aesthetic disciplines in order to create her work. Prior to completing a final composition she often executes as many as 20 preliminary sketches in pencil or pen. Which art medium she uses depends on what surface material she is using at the time. For example, on one of her artist's pages, it states: "when working with paper, panels or walls, she will employ acrylics while she will paint with oil on canvas or linen. She also recently experimented working on Dibond, a lightweight aluminum panel where she will combine both oil and acrylic and sometimes will use a black fine-point pen when drawing on the surface". In a review of Snow's work on SFGate, art critic Kenneth Baker wrote: "Snow's paintings have the meandering, episodic quality of her occasional installation pieces. Abstractions that evoke maps and micro-cityscapes and circuitry, they suggest a mind flitting among fixations -- on a color here, a shape, texture or technique there. "Further Shore of Yesterday" (2005), though the most poised work on view, suggests something made by Joan Miro on speed."

Exhibitions 

Snow's work has exhibited extensively, including at the Sonoma Valley Museum of Art in Sonoma, California, The Crocker Art Museum in Sacramento, California, the Riverside Art Museum in Riverside, California, the University of California, San Diego Art Museum, the Monterey Museum of Art (MMA) in Monterey, California, and at the US Embassy, in Montevideo, Uruguay. Snow was an Artist-Ambassador for the United States Department of State to Uruguay in 2007. Recent exhibitions include ‘Badass Color’, a 2-person exhibition at Le Pavé d’Orsay in Paris and The 5th International Biennale of Non-Objective Art in Pont de Claix, France. Snow recently received the Denis Diderot Fellowship residency program at the Château d'Orquevaux Artist Residency in France, which she will attend in 2020.

Awards 

 Artadia Award (2000)
 Cadogan Fellowship

Press 

Among other publications, Snow's work has been written about in the Harvard Business Review, Hyperallergic, Minus Space, The L Magazine
, and In The Make Magazine.

Galleries 

Snow is represented by Galleri Urbane in Dallas, Texas, Jen Bekman Gallery in New York, New York, and by IdeelArt.com.

Selected works

External links 

 Artadia Award Interview with Jessica Snow
 Studio Visit with Jessica Snow on Vimeo
 Jessica Snow on the Apocalypse Mixtape radio show

References

Living people
American abstract artists
University of San Francisco faculty
People from San Francisco
University of California, Davis alumni
1964 births
Date of birth missing (living people)